Pstrokoński (feminine: Pstrokońska; plural: Pstrokońscy) is a Polish surname. Notable people with this surname include:

 Andrzej Pstrokoński (1936–2022), Polish basketball player
 Bohdan Poraj-Pstrokonski (born 1973), British actor
 Grażyna Pstrokońska-Nawratil (born 1947), Polish musician

See also
 

Polish-language surnames